The Minister of Finance is a member of the Hungarian cabinet and the head of the Ministry of Finance. The current minister is Mihály Varga.

The position was called as People's Commissar of Finance during the Hungarian Soviet Republic in 1919, and as Minister of National Economy between 2010 and 2018.

This page is a list of Ministers of Finance of Hungary.

Ministers of Finance (1848–1919)

Hungarian Kingdom (1848–1849)
Parties

Hungarian State (1849)
Parties

After the collapse of the Hungarian Revolution of 1848, the Hungarian Kingdom became an integral part of the Austrian Empire until 1867, when dual Austro-Hungarian Monarchy was created.

Hungarian Kingdom (1867–1918)
Parties

Hungarian People's Republic (1918–1919)
Parties

People's Commissars of Finance (1919)

Hungarian Soviet Republic (1919)
Parties

Counter-revolutionary governments (1919)
Parties

Ministers of Finance (1919–2010)

Hungarian People's Republic (1919)
Parties

Hungarian Republic (1919–1920)
Parties

Hungarian Kingdom (1920–1946)
Parties

Government of National Unity (1944–1945)
Parties

Soviet-backed provisional governments (1944–1946)
Parties

Hungarian Republic (1946–1949)
Parties

Hungarian People's Republic (1949–1989)
Parties

Hungarian Republic (1989–2010)
Parties

Ministers of National Economy (2010–2018)

Hungarian Republic / Hungary (2010–2018)
Parties

Ministers of Finance (2018–present)

Hungarian Republic / Hungary (2018–present)
Parties

See also
List of heads of state of Hungary
List of prime ministers of Hungary
List of Ministers of Agriculture of Hungary
List of Ministers of Civilian Intelligence Services of Hungary
List of Ministers of Croatian Affairs of Hungary
List of Ministers of Defence of Hungary
List of Ministers of Education of Hungary
List of Ministers of Foreign Affairs of Hungary
List of Ministers of Interior of Hungary
List of Ministers of Justice of Hungary
List of Ministers of Public Works and Transport of Hungary
Politics of Hungary

Finance Ministers